Sealed Cargo is a 1951 American war film about a fisherman, played by Dana Andrews, who gets tangled up with Nazis and their U-boats. Other major cast members are Claude Rains, Carla Balenda and Philip Dorn. Andrews' brother Steve Forrest has a small, uncredited part, one of his earliest screen roles. The movie was based on the novel The Gaunt Woman by Edmund Gilligan.

Plot
In 1943, at the height of the World War II Battle of the Atlantic, Captain Pat Banyon, skipper of the fishing trawler Daniel Webster, unloads his catch in his home port of Gloucester, Massachusetts. He reluctantly agrees to transport Margaret McLean to Trabo, a small community in Newfoundland. Shorthanded, he hires Danish sailor Konrad, and the Daniel Webster sails for the Grand Banks fishing grounds. Once at sea, another Dane, Holger, reports that the radio has been sabotaged. As Banyon knows all the crew well except for Konrad and fellow Dane Holger, he suspects one of them or even Margaret of being a German agent.

Sailing at night in heavy fog, they hear gunfire. They search for survivors and come upon the damaged Den Magre Kvinde (Danish for The Gaunt Woman), a Danish square-rigged sailing ship. She appears to have been damaged in a storm and then shelled. Aboard, they discover only the dazed Captain Skalder and a dead body. He claims that his crew abandoned ship in a storm, and that he was subsequently attacked by a U-boat. The Daniel Webster tows the stricken Kvinde to Trabo.

Konrad is suspicious: he notes that the German gunfire hit above the waterline (rather than below it, where a gunner intending to sink a ship would aim), and that while the tarpaulin covering the ship's boat is riddled with bullet holes, the boat itself is undamaged.  Banyon and Konrad separately sneak below decks to search the hold. When they meet, Konrad has a pistol, but he gives it to Banyon to prove where his loyalties lie. They accidentally discover a second, hidden hold containing rack upon rack of torpedoes — the ship is a tender, covertly resupplying the U-boat "wolfpacks". They watch undetected as Holger enters the hold and uses a radio to signal the Germans. However, before the pair can alert the military, Skalder's crew arrives in boats, so they pretend they know nothing. Skalder plans to resupply the U-boats at Trabo.

A Canadian flying boat lands in the harbor, and an officer inspects Skalder's papers. Finding nothing wrong, he informs Skalder that a corvette will arrive the next day to inspect his cargo. Banyon offers to leave one of his two Danish crewmen as a witness, allowing him to rid himself of the spy Holger without arousing suspicion.

Banyon leaves port, but once out of sight, one man remains aboard to sail to the nearest radio station, while Banyon and the rest take to the dories and return. Banyon sets up a night ambush; when the Germans come to take the villager's prisoner, the invaders are wiped out. Banyon and his men then set fire to the Kvinde under cover of darkness. In the resulting confusion, they board, overpower or kill the remainder of the crew, and free Margaret, who had been taken as a hostage.

Skalder claims to have set the ship to blow up in twenty minutes. Banyon does not believe him, but takes the ship out to sea, intending to destroy her safely away from the village. He and his men rig some torpedoes to explode. The Kvinde is approached by two U-boats seeking supplies. Skalder manages to get a gun and wounds his guard, Konrad, before he is killed. As a third U-boat surfaces, Banyon and another man help Konrad into a boat and row away under German gunfire. When the ship explodes, the resulting wave swamps the submarines, sinking them.

Cast
 Dana Andrews as Pat Banyon
 Carla Balenda as Margaret McLean
 Claude Rains as Captain Skalder
 Philip Dorn as Konrad
 Onslow Stevens as Commander James McLean, Margaret's father
 Skip Homeier as Steve
 Eric Feldary as Holger
 J. M. Kerrigan as Skipper Ben
 Arthur Shields as Kevin Dolan
 Morgan Farley as Caleb

References

External links
 
 
 
 

1951 films
1951 war films
American war films
American black-and-white films
1950s English-language films
Films scored by Roy Webb
Films about fishing
Films based on American novels
Films directed by Alfred L. Werker
Films produced by Samuel Bischoff
Films set in 1943
Films set in Newfoundland and Labrador
RKO Pictures films
World War II submarine films
1950s American films